Bongiwe Msomi (born 19 January 1988) is a South African netball player. She plays in the positions of Centre and Wing Attack.

Msomi has a National Diploma in Sport Management through the Durban University of Technology.

Msomi is the founder of Bongi Msomi Netball Project, a non-profit company that focuses on raising the profile of netball through skills development, the transfer of knowledge and experiences gained, as well as the holistic development of the coach/player/child and athlete. in her hometown Mpumalanga Township unit 4 Hammarsdale.

Early life, family and early netball development
Msomi was born and raised in Durban, South Africa, growing up in Hammarsdale. Msomi is the fifth of eight children. Her mother was a machinist, making clothing in a factory. Her father passed away at the beginning of her career. Msomi's younger sister plays netball provincially. Msomi had no role models in netball when she was young as there was no professional netball on television, nor did she know of any black netball players.

Msomi started playing netball in 2004 at the age of 16 while at Chief Luthayi High School in Durban. In her first match she was a fill-in player playing the position Wing Defence when the team was one player short. She did not have training shoes or kit at the time and was provided an old kit by the school coach S’thembiso G. Mncwabe so she could continue to play. Msomi would change out of the sports kit at the courts before returning home where she would not be allowed to wear the clothes at home for cultural reasons. Msomi credits Mncwabe, her first netball coach with beginning and supporting her netball career. Msomi reported that Mncwabe used his own money to buy balls, cones and shoes to allow the women he coached to play.

In 2005 Msomi was chosen to represent eThekwini Region at the Salga KZN-DSR Games and she changed position from goal attack to centre.

After representing eThekwini at the Salga KZN-DSR Games, Msomi joined the under-19 team and then the under-21 team. Msomi captained the under-21s team at the 2009 World Youth Netball Championships in the Cook Islands. Msomi captained the under-21s team at the 2009 World Youth Netball Championships in the Cook Islands.

National career
Msomi played for KwaZulu-Natal’s Kingdom Stars in South Africa, captaining the team in the Brutal Fruit Premier League.

In 2010, Msomi was invited to the SPAR Proteas training camp but missed the cut for the squad. The following year she was again part of the SPAR Proteas training camp and made the team for the 2011 World Netball Championships in Singapore.

Msomi made her debut for the Proteas in 2011 and became deputy to Maryka Holtzhausen in 2013.

On 18 August 2016 Msomi was announced as captain of the SPAR Proteas for their tour of New Zealand and Australia for the Quad Series. She succeeded Holtzhausen who suffered a knee injury in the SPAR national championships in Durban the previous week. Msomi has remained the captain of the SPAR Proteas squad for the 2017 and 2018 Quad Series.

Msomi led her team to their first ever Quad Series victory against the England Roses at Invercargill, New Zealand beating them 54-51 in 2017.

International career
Msomi’s first international netball contract was in the UK for Surrey Storm in the UK Netball Superleague. Tamsin Greenway, the Surrey Storm coach first saw her play at the 2014 Commonwealth Games in Glasgow and later made Msomi an offer to play for the team. Msomi played Wing Attack and Centre for Surrey in 2015, then the Wasps in 2017. Both teams were coached by Tamsin Greenway and in both years the teams won the league.

In 2017 Msomi received an offer from the Adelaide Thunderbirds, and in 2018 joined the team as to play in Australia’s Suncorp Super Netball. At the end of the 2018 season she returned to the UK to play for Wasps Netball.

References

South African netball players
1988 births
Living people
Netball players at the 2018 Commonwealth Games
Adelaide Thunderbirds players
2019 Netball World Cup players
South African expatriate netball people in Australia
South African expatriate netball people in England
Wasps Netball players
Netball Superleague players
Surrey Storm players
Durban University of Technology alumni
Suncorp Super Netball players
Commonwealth Games competitors for South Africa
2011 World Netball Championships players